Michalka is a surname, often of Czech and Slovak origin. It can also be a nickname for Michaela.

People with the surname include:

Aly Michalka (born 1989), American singer, actress, and member of Aly & AJ
AJ Michalka (born 1991), American singer, actress, and member of Aly & AJ

Surnames